The 1921 Pittsburgh Pirates season was the 40th season of the Pittsburgh Pirates franchise; the 35th in the National League. The Pirates finished second in the league standings with a record of 90–63. It would be the first that games would be aired on radio via the then new station KDKA-AM to listeners all over Pittsburgh, making that team the first in the MLB to employ radio broadcasters for game broadcasts on the then new medium.

Regular season

Season standings

Record vs. opponents

Game log

|- bgcolor="ffbbbb"
| 1 || April 13 || @ Reds || 3–5 || Luque || Adams (0–1) || — || 30,444 || 0–1
|- bgcolor="ccffcc"
| 2 || April 14 || @ Reds || 7–2 || Cooper (1–0) || Marquard || — || — || 1–1
|- bgcolor="ccffcc"
| 3 || April 15 || @ Reds || 3–1 || Hamilton (1–0) || Rixey || Yellow Horse (1) || — || 2–1
|- bgcolor="ccffcc"
| 4 || April 16 || @ Reds || 7–3 || Ponder (1–0) || Brenton || — || — || 3–1
|- bgcolor="ffbbbb"
| 5 || April 18 || @ Cubs || 4–7 || Tyler || Zinn (0–1) || — || — || 3–2
|- bgcolor="ccffcc"
| 6 || April 19 || @ Cubs || 14–2 || Hamilton (2–0) || Martin || — || — || 4–2
|- bgcolor="ccffcc"
| 7 || April 20 || @ Cubs || 6–5 || Carlson (1–0) || Freeman || Glazner (1) || — || 5–2
|- bgcolor="ccffcc"
| 8 || April 21 || Reds || 8–7 || Yellow Horse (1–0) || Brenton || — || — || 6–2
|- bgcolor="ccffcc"
| 9 || April 22 || Reds || 6–1 || Zinn (1–1) || Luque || — || — || 7–2
|- bgcolor="ffbbbb"
| 10 || April 23 || Reds || 4–5 || Marquard || Hamilton (2–1) || — || — || 7–3
|- bgcolor="ccffcc"
| 11 || April 24 || @ Reds || 7–2 || Adams (1–1) || Rixey || — || — || 8–3
|- bgcolor="ccffcc"
| 12 || April 25 || @ Cardinals || 6–5 (10) || Ponder (2–0) || Pertica || — || — || 9–3
|- bgcolor="ccffcc"
| 13 || April 27 || @ Cardinals || 7–4 || Hamilton (3–1) || May || Zinn (1) || — || 10–3
|- bgcolor="ccffcc"
| 14 || April 29 || Cubs || 3–0 || Cooper (2–0) || York || — || — || 11–3
|-

|- bgcolor="ccffcc"
| 15 || May 1 || @ Cubs || 2–0 || Adams (2–1) || Vaughn || — || — || 12–3
|- bgcolor="ccffcc"
| 16 || May 2 || @ Cubs || 4–3 || Glazner (1–0) || Martin || — || — || 13–3
|- bgcolor="ccffcc"
| 17 || May 5 || Cardinals || 8–3 || Cooper (3–0) || Pertica || — || — || 14–3
|- bgcolor="ccffcc"
| 18 || May 6 || Cardinals || 10–6 || Hamilton (4–1) || Haines || Zinn (2) || — || 15–3
|- bgcolor="ccffcc"
| 19 || May 7 || Cardinals || 2–1 || Glazner (2–0) || Sherdel || — || — || 16–3
|- bgcolor="ffbbbb"
| 20 || May 8 || @ Reds || 0–1 || Rixey || Adams (2–2) || — || — || 16–4
|- bgcolor="ccffcc"
| 21 || May 10 || @ Braves || 5–2 || Cooper (4–0) || Oeschger || — || — || 17–4
|- bgcolor="ffbbbb"
| 22 || May 11 || @ Braves || 0–1 (13) || Fillingim || Hamilton (4–2) || — || — || 17–5
|- bgcolor="ccffcc"
| 23 || May 12 || @ Braves || 3–1 || Glazner (3–0) || Watson || — || — || 18–5
|- bgcolor="ccffcc"
| 24 || May 14 || @ Phillies || 6–4 (10) || Cooper (5–0) || Smith || — || — || 19–5
|- bgcolor="ffbbbb"
| 25 || May 16 || @ Phillies || 0–3 || Causey || Hamilton (4–3) || Ring || — || 19–6
|- bgcolor="ccffcc"
| 26 || May 17 || @ Phillies || 6–4 || Glazner (4–0) || Hubbell || — || — || 20–6
|- bgcolor="ccffcc"
| 27 || May 18 || @ Robins || 11–2 || Cooper (6–0) || Ruether || — || 10,000 || 21–6
|- bgcolor="ccffcc"
| 28 || May 19 || @ Robins || 7–5 || Adams (3–2) || Smith || — || 10,000 || 22–6
|- bgcolor="ccffcc"
| 29 || May 20 || @ Robins || 3–2 || Hamilton (5–3) || Cadore || — || 8,000 || 23–6
|- bgcolor="ccffcc"
| 30 || May 21 || @ Robins || 13–6 || Zinn (2–1) || Mitchell || Carlson (1) || 20,000 || 24–6
|- bgcolor="ccffcc"
| 31 || May 22 || @ Giants || 8–6 || Cooper (7–0) || Sallee || — || 40,000 || 25–6
|- bgcolor="ffbbbb"
| 32 || May 24 || @ Giants || 3–5 || Nehf || Adams (3–3) || — || — || 25–7
|- bgcolor="ffbbbb"
| 33 || May 26 || Reds || 1–4 || Marquard || Hamilton (5–4) || — || — || 25–8
|- bgcolor="ccffcc"
| 34 || May 27 || Reds || 5–4 || Cooper (8–0) || Rixey || — || — || 26–8
|- bgcolor="ccffcc"
| 35 || May 28 || Reds || 4–3 || Adams (4–3) || Luque || — || — || 27–8
|- bgcolor="ffbbbb"
| 36 || May 29 || @ Reds || 3–4 (13) || Rixey || Carlson (1–1) || — || — || 27–9
|- bgcolor="ccffcc"
| 37 || May 30 || Cubs || 13–0 || Zinn (3–1) || York || — || — || 28–9
|- bgcolor="ccffcc"
| 38 || May 30 || Cubs || 6–3 || Yellow Horse (2–0) || Tyler || — || — || 29–9
|- bgcolor="ffbbbb"
| 39 || May 31 || Cubs || 6–7 (12) || Freeman || Hamilton (5–5) || — || — || 29–10
|-

|- bgcolor="ccffcc"
| 40 || June 1 || Cubs || 4–2 || Glazner (5–0) || Martin || — || — || 30–10
|- bgcolor="ffbbbb"
| 41 || June 2 || Giants || 0–7 || Nehf || Zinn (3–2) || — || 20,000 || 30–11
|- bgcolor="ffbbbb"
| 42 || June 3 || Giants || 1–4 || Toney || Hamilton (5–6) || — || 15,000 || 30–12
|- bgcolor="ffbbbb"
| 43 || June 4 || Giants || 0–12 || Douglas || Cooper (8–1) || — || 25,000 || 30–13
|- bgcolor="ccffcc"
| 44 || June 6 || Giants || 5–4 || Adams (5–3) || Barnes || — || 9,000 || 31–13
|- bgcolor="ffbbbb"
| 45 || June 7 || Braves || 7–10 || Oeschger || Yellow Horse (2–1) || — || — || 31–14
|- bgcolor="ccffcc"
| 46 || June 8 || Braves || 16–4 || Hamilton (6–6) || McQuillan || — || — || 32–14
|- bgcolor="ccffcc"
| 47 || June 9 || Braves || 5–3 || Cooper (9–1) || Fillingim || — || — || 33–14
|- bgcolor="ffbbbb"
| 48 || June 10 || Braves || 1–4 || Scott || Glazner (5–1) || — || — || 33–15
|- bgcolor="ccffcc"
| 49 || June 11 || Phillies || 10–3 || Adams (6–3) || Hubbell || — || — || 34–15
|- bgcolor="ccffcc"
| 50 || June 13 || Phillies || 12–5 || Hamilton (7–6) || Baumgartner || — || — || 35–15
|- bgcolor="ccffcc"
| 51 || June 14 || Phillies || 8–3 || Zinn (4–2) || Ring || — || — || 36–15
|- bgcolor="ffbbbb"
| 52 || June 15 || Robins || 3–7 || Grimes || Cooper (9–2) || — || 7,000 || 36–16
|- bgcolor="ccffcc"
| 53 || June 16 || Robins || 6–5 (17) || Yellow Horse (3–1) || Mamaux || — || 5,000 || 37–16
|- bgcolor="ffbbbb"
| 54 || June 17 || Robins || 3–8 || Cadore || Hamilton (7–7) || — || 8,000 || 37–17
|- bgcolor="ccffcc"
| 55 || June 18 || Robins || 4–3 || Cooper (10–2) || Ruether || — || 18,000 || 38–17
|- bgcolor="ccffcc"
| 56 || June 20 || Phillies || 3–2 || Yellow Horse (4–1) || Meadows || Zinn (3) || — || 39–17
|- bgcolor="ccffcc"
| 57 || June 22 || @ Reds || 5–2 (12) || Cooper (11–2) || Rixey || — || — || 40–17
|- bgcolor="ffbbbb"
| 58 || June 23 || @ Cardinals || 2–3 (12) || Walker || Carlson (1–2) || — || — || 40–18
|- bgcolor="ffbbbb"
| 59 || June 23 || @ Cardinals || 3–4 || Doak || Zinn (4–3) || — || — || 40–19
|- bgcolor="ccffcc"
| 60 || June 24 || @ Cardinals || 4–3 (10) || Glazner (6–1) || Bailey || — || — || 41–19
|- bgcolor="ffbbbb"
| 61 || June 25 || @ Cardinals || 4–7 || Pfeffer || Yellow Horse (4–2) || North || — || 41–20
|- bgcolor="ccffcc"
| 62 || June 25 || @ Cardinals || 5–2 || Cooper (12–2) || Pertica || — || — || 42–20
|- bgcolor="ccffcc"
| 63 || June 26 || @ Cubs || 11–3 || Adams (7–3) || Alexander || — || — || 43–20
|- bgcolor="ccffcc"
| 64 || June 27 || @ Cubs || 10–3 || Morrison (1–0) || Vaughn || — || — || 44–20
|- bgcolor="ffbbbb"
| 65 || June 28 || @ Cubs || 1–2 || Martin || Zinn (4–4) || — || — || 44–21
|- bgcolor="ffbbbb"
| 66 || June 28 || @ Cubs || 6–8 || Tyler || Carlson (1–3) || — || — || 44–22
|- bgcolor="ccffcc"
| 67 || June 29 || @ Cubs || 3–1 || Cooper (13–2) || Cheeves || — || — || 45–22
|- bgcolor="ccffcc"
| 68 || June 30 || Reds || 5–3 || Yellow Horse (5–2) || Luque || — || — || 46–22
|-

|- bgcolor="ccffcc"
| 69 || July 1 || Reds || 5–2 || Morrison (2–0) || Rixey || — || — || 47–22
|- bgcolor="ccffcc"
| 70 || July 2 || Reds || 9–0 || Adams (8–3) || Brenton || — || — || 48–22
|- bgcolor="ffbbbb"
| 71 || July 3 || @ Reds || 2–8 || Marquard || Hamilton (7–8) || — || — || 48–23
|- bgcolor="ccffcc"
| 72 || July 4 || Cardinals || 5–2 || Glazner (7–1) || Bailey || — || — || 49–23
|- bgcolor="ffbbbb"
| 73 || July 4 || Cardinals || 3–6 || Pertica || Cooper (13–3) || — || — || 49–24
|- bgcolor="ffbbbb"
| 74 || July 5 || Cardinals || 2–8 || Walker || Yellow Horse (5–3) || — || — || 49–25
|- bgcolor="ccffcc"
| 75 || July 6 || Cardinals || 3–2 (13) || Morrison (3–0) || North || — || — || 50–25
|- bgcolor="ccffcc"
| 76 || July 8 || @ Robins || 5–3 || Cooper (14–3) || Schupp || — || — || 51–25
|- bgcolor="ccffcc"
| 77 || July 9 || @ Robins || 4–2 || Glazner (8–1) || Cadore || — || 8,000 || 52–25
|- bgcolor="ffbbbb"
| 78 || July 10 || @ Robins || 3–7 || Grimes || Morrison (3–1) || — || 10,000 || 52–26
|- bgcolor="ffbbbb"
| 79 || July 11 || @ Robins || 8–9 || Miljus || Hamilton (7–9) || — || 8,000 || 52–27
|- bgcolor="ccffcc"
| 80 || July 12 || @ Phillies || 9–4 || Cooper (15–3) || Baumgartner || — || — || 53–27
|- bgcolor="ccffcc"
| 81 || July 14 || @ Phillies || 5–4 (10) || Carlson (2–3) || Ring || — || — || 54–27
|- bgcolor="ffbbbb"
| 82 || July 16 || @ Giants || 4–13 || Douglas || Cooper (15–4) || — || 33,000 || 54–28
|- bgcolor="ccffcc"
| 83 || July 17 || @ Giants || 4–2 (10) || Hamilton (8–9) || Causey || — || 36,000 || 55–28
|- bgcolor="ffbbbb"
| 84 || July 18 || @ Giants || 1–12 || Nehf || Morrison (3–2) || — || 10,000 || 55–29
|- bgcolor="ccffcc"
| 85 || July 19 || @ Giants || 10–1 || Adams (9–3) || Ryan || — || 18,000 || 56–29
|- bgcolor="ccffcc"
| 86 || July 20 || @ Braves || 2–0 || Cooper (16–4) || Oeschger || — || — || 57–29
|- bgcolor="ffbbbb"
| 87 || July 22 || @ Braves || 1–2 (10) || McQuillan || Hamilton (8–10) || — || — || 57–30
|- bgcolor="ccffcc"
| 88 || July 22 || @ Braves || 4–3 (13) || Glazner (9–1) || Fillingim || — || — || 58–30
|- bgcolor="ccffcc"
| 89 || July 23 || @ Braves || 3–2 || Cooper (17–4) || Watson || — || — || 59–30
|- bgcolor="ffbbbb"
| 90 || July 23 || @ Braves || 1–3 || Scott || Carlson (2–4) || — || — || 59–31
|- bgcolor="ccffcc"
| 91 || July 25 || Giants || 6–3 || Adams (10–3) || Douglas || — || 20,000 || 60–31
|- bgcolor="ffbbbb"
| 92 || July 26 || Giants || 8–9 (10) || Barnes || Glazner (9–2) || — || 15,000 || 60–32
|- bgcolor="ffbbbb"
| 93 || July 27 || Giants || 1–4 || Nehf || Cooper (17–5) || — || — || 60–33
|- bgcolor="ffbbbb"
| 94 || July 28 || Giants || 4–6 || Douglas || Glazner (9–3) || Ryan || 15,000 || 60–34
|- bgcolor="ffbbbb"
| 95 || July 30 || Braves || 0–1 || Oeschger || Cooper (17–6) || — || — || 60–35
|-

|- bgcolor="ccffcc"
| 96 || August 1 || Braves || 7–3 || Adams (11–3) || McQuillan || — || — || 61–35
|- bgcolor="ccffcc"
| 97 || August 3 || Phillies || 9–5 || Cooper (18–6) || Winters || — || — || 62–35
|- bgcolor="ccffcc"
| 98 || August 4 || Phillies || 5–0 || Hamilton (9–10) || Meadows || — || — || 63–35
|- bgcolor="ccffcc"
| 99 || August 5 || Phillies || 8–5 || Zinn (5–4) || Ring || — || — || 64–35
|- bgcolor="ffbbbb"
| 100 || August 6 || Robins || 2–3 || Cadore || Glazner (9–4) || — || 18,000 || 64–36
|- bgcolor="ffbbbb"
| 101 || August 8 || Robins || 2–4 || Grimes || Cooper (18–7) || — || 8,000 || 64–37
|- bgcolor="ccffcc"
| 102 || August 9 || Robins || 4–2 || Adams (12–3) || Mitchell || Zinn (4) || 8,000 || 65–37
|- bgcolor="ffbbbb"
| 103 || August 10 || Robins || 0–1 || Cadore || Morrison (3–3) || — || 6,000 || 65–38
|- bgcolor="ccffcc"
| 104 || August 11 || Cubs || 7–3 || Hamilton (10–10) || Alexander || — || — || 66–38
|- bgcolor="ccffcc"
| 105 || August 11 || Cubs || 5–4 (11) || Zinn (6–4) || Martin || — || — || 67–38
|- bgcolor="ccffcc"
| 106 || August 12 || Cubs || 12–9 || Cooper (19–7) || Cheeves || — || — || 68–38
|- bgcolor="ccffcc"
| 107 || August 13 || Cubs || 4–3 || Glazner (10–4) || Freeman || — || — || 69–38
|- bgcolor="ccffcc"
| 108 || August 14 || @ Cubs || 1–0 || Morrison (4–3) || Martin || — || — || 70–38
|- bgcolor="ffbbbb"
| 109 || August 16 || @ Phillies || 5–6 || Betts || Cooper (19–8) || — || — || 70–39
|- bgcolor="ccffcc"
| 110 || August 16 || @ Phillies || 8–6 (11) || Zinn (7–4) || Smith || — || — || 71–39
|- bgcolor="ccffcc"
| 111 || August 18 || @ Phillies || 4–3 || Hamilton (11–10) || Ring || Carlson (2) || — || 72–39
|- bgcolor="ccffcc"
| 112 || August 18 || @ Phillies || 3–2 || Glazner (11–4) || Winters || — || — || 73–39
|- bgcolor="ccffcc"
| 113 || August 19 || @ Phillies || 14–3 || Morrison (5–3) || Meadows || — || — || 74–39
|- bgcolor="ffbbbb"
| 114 || August 19 || @ Phillies || 1–4 || Hubbell || Zinn (7–5) || — || — || 74–40
|- bgcolor="ccffcc"
| 115 || August 20 || @ Braves || 6–4 (13) || Cooper (20–8) || Fillingim || — || — || 75–40
|- bgcolor="ccffcc"
| 116 || August 22 || @ Braves || 10–8 || Hamilton (12–10) || McQuillan || Carlson (3) || — || 76–40
|- bgcolor="ffbbbb"
| 117 || August 23 || @ Braves || 3–4 || Watson || Glazner (11–5) || — || — || 76–41
|- bgcolor="ffbbbb"
| 118 || August 24 || @ Giants || 2–10 || Nehf || Adams (12–4) || — || — || 76–42
|- bgcolor="ffbbbb"
| 119 || August 24 || @ Giants || 0–7 || Douglas || Cooper (20–9) || — || — || 76–43
|- bgcolor="ffbbbb"
| 120 || August 25 || @ Giants || 2–5 || Toney || Morrison (5–4) || — || 12,000 || 76–44
|- bgcolor="ffbbbb"
| 121 || August 26 || @ Giants || 1–2 || Douglas || Hamilton (12–11) || — || 15,000 || 76–45
|- bgcolor="ffbbbb"
| 122 || August 27 || @ Giants || 1–3 || Nehf || Carlson (2–5) || — || 36,000 || 76–46
|- bgcolor="ccffcc"
| 123 || August 28 || @ Robins || 2–0 || Morrison (6–4) || Grimes || — || 20,000 || 77–46
|- bgcolor="ffbbbb"
| 124 || August 29 || @ Robins || 0–1 || Ruether || Cooper (20–10) || — || 4,500 || 77–47
|- bgcolor="ccffcc"
| 125 || August 30 || @ Robins || 8–2 || Glazner (12–5) || Cadore || — || — || 78–47
|-

|- bgcolor="ffbbbb"
| 126 || September 1 || Cardinals || 4–10 || Pertica || Hamilton (12–12) || — || — || 78–48
|- bgcolor="ffbbbb"
| 127 || September 1 || Cardinals || 0–8 || Sherdel || Morrison (6–5) || — || — || 78–49
|- bgcolor="ffbbbb"
| 128 || September 2 || Cardinals || 0–1 || Haines || Carlson (2–6) || — || — || 78–50
|- bgcolor="ccffcc"
| 129 || September 4 || @ Reds || 2–1 (12) || Glazner (13–5) || Luque || — || — || 79–50
|- bgcolor="ffbbbb"
| 130 || September 5 || Reds || 1–2 (13) || Rixey || Hamilton (12–13) || — || — || 79–51
|- bgcolor="ccffcc"
| 131 || September 5 || Reds || 2–1 || Cooper (21–10) || Markle || — || — || 80–51
|- bgcolor="ffbbbb"
| 132 || September 9 || Cubs || 5–8 || Freeman || Cooper (21–11) || Alexander || — || 80–52
|- bgcolor="ccffcc"
| 133 || September 10 || Cubs || 8–0 || Morrison (7–5) || Alexander || — || 10,000 || 81–52
|- bgcolor="ffbbbb"
| 134 || September 11 || @ Reds || 1–4 || Marquard || Hamilton (12–14) || — || 3,000 || 81–53
|- bgcolor="ccffcc"
| 135 || September 12 || Braves || 5–4 (15) || Adams (13–4) || Scott || — || 8,000 || 82–53
|- bgcolor="ffbbbb"
| 136 || September 12 || Braves || 3–4 || Morgan || Zinn (7–6) || — || — || 82–54
|- bgcolor="ccffcc"
| 137 || September 13 || Braves || 5–3 || Carlson (3–6) || McQuillan || — || 5,000 || 83–54
|- bgcolor="ccffcc"
| 138 || September 14 || Braves || 5–2 || Morrison (8–5) || Fillingim || — || — || 84–54
|- bgcolor="ffbbbb"
| 139 || September 15 || Braves || 3–6 || Scott || Cooper (21–12) || — || 5,000 || 84–55
|- bgcolor="ffbbbb"
| 140 || September 16 || Giants || 0–5 || Toney || Hamilton (12–15) || — || 25,000 || 84–56
|- bgcolor="ffbbbb"
| 141 || September 17 || Giants || 1–6 || Nehf || Carlson (3–7) || — || 25,000 || 84–57
|- bgcolor="ccffcc"
| 142 || September 19 || Giants || 2–1 || Adams (14–4) || Douglas || — || 10,000 || 85–57
|- bgcolor="ffbbbb"
| 143 || September 21 || Robins || 0–2 (7) || Mitchell || Morrison (8–6) || — || 3,000 || 85–58
|- bgcolor="ccffcc"
| 144 || September 22 || Robins || 3–1 || Glazner (14–5) || Grimes || Carlson (4) || 8,000 || 86–58
|- bgcolor="ffbbbb"
| 145 || September 22 || Robins || 0–2 || Cadore || Cooper (21–13) || Smith || 12,000 || 86–59
|- bgcolor="ccffcc"
| 146 || September 23 || Phillies || 2–0 || Hamilton (13–15) || Meadows || — || 2,500 || 87–59
|- bgcolor="ccffcc"
| 147 || September 24 || Phillies || 4–3 || Morrison (9–6) || Ring || — || 6,000 || 88–59
|- bgcolor="ffbbbb"
| 148 || September 26 || Phillies || 1–2 || Hubbell || Adams (14–5) || — || 1,500 || 88–60
|- bgcolor="ccffcc"
| 149 || September 27 || Phillies || 9–6 || Carlson (4–7) || Winters || — || 300 || 89–60
|- bgcolor="ffbbbb"
| 150 || September 29 || @ Cardinals || 4–5 (10) || North || Cooper (21–14) || — || 5,000 || 89–61
|- bgcolor="ffbbbb"
| 151 || September 29 || @ Cardinals || 1–3 (6) || Sherdel || Morrison (9–7) || — || — || 89–62
|- bgcolor="ffbbbb"
| 152 || September 30 || @ Cardinals || 4–12 || Haines || Carlson (4–8) || — || — || 89–63
|-

|- bgcolor="ffffff"
| 153 || October 1 || @ Cardinals || 4–4 ||  ||  || — || — || 89–63
|- bgcolor="ccffcc"
| 154 || October 2 || @ Cardinals || 4–3 || Cooper (22–14) || North || — || — || 90–63
|-

|-
| Legend:       = Win       = Loss       = TieBold = Pirates team member

Opening Day lineup

Roster

Player stats

Batting

Starters by position 
Note: Pos = Position; G = Games played; AB = At bats; H = Hits; Avg. = Batting average; HR = Home runs; RBI = Runs batted in

Other batters 
Note: G = Games played; AB = At bats; H = Hits; Avg. = Batting average; HR = Home runs; RBI = Runs batted in

Pitching

Starting pitchers 
Note: G = Games pitched; IP = Innings pitched; W = Wins; L = Losses; ERA = Earned run average; SO = Strikeouts

Other pitchers 
Note: G = Games pitched; IP = Innings pitched; W = Wins; L = Losses; ERA = Earned run average; SO = Strikeouts

Relief pitchers 
Note: G = Games pitched; W = Wins; L = Losses; SV = Saves; ERA = Earned run average; SO = Strikeouts

Farm system

References 

 1921 Pittsburgh Pirates team page at Baseball Reference
 1921 Pittsburgh Pirates Page at Baseball Almanac

Pittsburgh Pirates seasons
Pittsburgh Pirates season
Pittsburg Pir